The Seal of Tagum is one of the official symbols of the city of Tagum.

Description
The seal has the following description and symbolisms:

The seal is described to be of a classic "crest and ribbon" style which is used to convey nobility and tradition. The crest or circular shield is of gold color which symbolizes the "golden image" of the city, the gold, precious metal and jewelry trade which is one of the primary industry of the city as a trading center. It also symbolizes the rich ethnic and cultural heritage of the city's inhabitants.
The crest are emblazoned with symbols representing the aquaculture and agriculture of the city including the flower cutting industry. The agriculture industry of the city is represented by historical and present high value crops of the city - the durian, banana and coconut.
The interlocking gears symbolizes the modernization of the city - the development of the city's infrastructure and trade and commercial industry.
The agriculture and aquaculture symbols and the gears, are separated by a brown lines which resembles points of a compass. It symbolizes the city's "dynamism in developing many different industries"
Below the crest are ribbons in green and brown bearing the inscriptions “CITY OF TAGUM on the green ribbon, PROVINCE OF DAVAO DEL NORTE” on the brown ribbon. These seeks to proclaim the city's pride in its inhabitants and its rich land which yields high value produce and precious metals.

References

Seal
Tagum